Colin 'Cole' Moss (born 9 February 1976), is a South African actor primarily active in British, American and South African cinema and television.

Personal life
He was born on 9 February 1976 in Johannesburg, South Africa. His father Richard Moss is British-South African where paternal grandfather was a Cockney. His mother Veronica Salt was with an Irish background. Therefore, Colin has born with a mixed cultural descent of British, Irish, German and South African. He has excelled ukulele and saxophone playing.

He is married to South African director, Tamarin Kaplan. The wedding was celebrated in 2014 in Stellenbosch.

Career
He started his acting career as a stand-up comedian on the South African stand-up comedy circuit. He continued to perform comedy between acting gigs for many years. Later he graduated with a degree in drama at the University of Kwazulu-Natal in 1996. He started acting through some theater productions such as Fat Pig and My Zinc Bed. At the end of the 1990s, he performed regularly with his own stage programs as a comedian in South Africa and at various comedy festivals. a. also in Great Britain and Ireland. In the further course of his career, Moss continued to work as a comedian. Since 2003 head of the comedy troupe 'Comedy All Stars Cape Town' in Cape Town. In 2010, he performed his own comedy program at the Stand Up Comedy Club in New York City.

In 1998, he made television debut with the television serial Isidingo where he played the role 'Stewart Buller'. He appeared in the series from 1999 to 2001 with huge popularity. Then he went to Cape Town, and worked as a television presenter for various television shows, including 2001 TV show City Life. In 2002, he became the presenter of the stunt show Fear Factor. In 2003, 2005 and 2007 he took over the moderation of the music and talent show 'Idols South Africa' in season 3.

In 2005, Moss played the leading male role in the South African drama Number 10. The he starred in the South African Horror Cryptid in 2006 took over the role of Mioss Dan Huevelman. In 2007, he joined with the South African comedy film Big Fellas and played one of the two main roles; 'young Jake Holmes'. In the same year, he acted in the British-South African film The Hidden World where he played the role of 'Officer De Witt'. In 2008, he had a supporting role as 'John' in the Italian-French comedy Ex. Then he played the documentary filmmaker and expedition member 'Dexter "Dex" Simms' in the horror film Surviving Evil in 2009.

Due to his western look, he has selected for many international film roles such as: 'Officer DeWitt' in the period drama The World Unseen. The film received critical acclaim and won several international awards. Then he made a lead role in the film Surviving Evil where he acted alongside Billy Zane. He also played the role of 'Max' in a BBC adaptation of D.H. Lawrence's Women in Love. Moss played the role 'Kevin Fuller' in the film Momentum alongside James Purefoy and Morgan Freeman.

In March 2014, he appeared in the German television film . In 2015, he relocated to New York City and quickly signed by The Talent House. After that, he played a recurring role 'Justin Boden' on Marvel's hit Netflix series, Jessica Jones. Then he played the role of 'Anthony' in the Netflix's Black Mirror as well as in David Simon's series The Deuce. Meanwhile, he made a supporting role in the film Then Came You and the supportive role of 'Drew Conrad' in the film Christmas in the Wild.

In 2019, he played the role 'Hath' in SyFy Channel's television serial Vagrant Queen, which marked his first series regular role for an American channel.

Filmography

References

External links
 

Living people
1976 births
South African male television actors
People from Johannesburg
British male television actors
American male television actors